Struan is a locality located within the Naracoorte Lucindale Council in the Limestone Coast region of South Australia.

The railway between Wolseley and Mount Gambier passed through here but closed on 12 April 1995.

References

Limestone Coast